The United States District Court for the Southern District of Alabama (in case citations, S.D. Ala.) is a federal court in the Eleventh Circuit (except for patent claims and claims against the U.S. government under the Tucker Act, which are appealed to the Federal Circuit).

The District was established on March 10, 1824, with the division of the state into a Northern and Southern district.

The United States Attorney's Office for the Southern District of Alabama represents the United States in civil and criminal litigation in the court.  the United States Attorney is Sean P. Costello.

Organization of the court 
The United States District Court for the Southern District of Alabama is one of three federal judicial districts in Alabama. Court for the District is held at Mobile and Selma.

Mobile Division comprises the following counties: Baldwin, Choctaw, Clarke, Conecuh, Escambia, Mobile, Monroe, and Washington.

Selma Division comprises the following counties: Dallas, Hale, Marengo, Perry, and Wilcox.

Current judges 

:

Former judges

Chief judges

Succession of seats

Court decisions 

Wallace v. Jaffree (1983) – Court affirmed that silent prayer was permissible in Mobile County public schools.  Decision was reversed by Eleventh Circuit and U.S. Supreme Court, both ruling that it violated the Establishment Clause of the First Amendment.

Smith v. Board of School Commissioners of Mobile County (1987) – Court rules that textbooks promoting secular humanism were unconstitutional, running contrary to the Establishment Clause of the First Amendment.  Decision was reversed by Eleventh Circuit, which held that secular humanism was not a violation of the Establishment Clause as it is not a system of belief constituting a "religion".

Searcy v. Strange (2015) – District Judge Callie V. S. "Ginny" Granade ruled that Alabama's ban on same-sex marriage was unconstitutional, violating the 14th Amendment's equal protection clause, on January 23. Days later, she issued an order clarifying her ruling, saying that all Alabama probate judges, who issue marriage licenses, must comply with the order. She stayed her order for two weeks to allow state defendants time to seek a stay from a higher court. On February 3, the Eleventh Circuit denied the stay, after denying a stay in a similar case out of Florida months before. On February 9, as the order was set to take effect, the U.S. Supreme Court also denied the stay.

See also 
 Courts of Alabama
 List of current United States district judges
 List of United States federal courthouses in Alabama

References

External links
 United States District Court for the Southern District of Alabama
 United States Attorney for the Southern District of Alabama

Alabama, Southern District
Alabama law
Mobile, Alabama
Selma, Alabama
1824 establishments in Alabama
Courts and tribunals established in 1824